Come Fly with Me is the first live album by Canadian singer Michael Bublé released on March 8, 2004. It features songs from Buble's live performances in 2003.

The album consists of an audio CD with eight songs, including two new studio recordings: "Nice 'n' Easy" and "Can't Help Falling in Love".

The video consists of a live in-concert DVD featuring 12 songs recorded during his first worldwide tour. The video of the live performances reached the top 10 of the Billboard Music Video DVD charts of early May 2004. The album made the top 100 of the Billboard Top 200 and has also made the top 50 at the Australian Top 100 Albums Chart. The album rose to #4 on the chart, while Buble's self-titled album peaked at #3, both in the same week. Come Fly With Me was certified gold by ARIA (Australian Charts) in 2006.

Track listing

Charts

Weekly charts

Year-end charts

References

Michael Bublé albums
2004 live albums
143 Records live albums